Donna Marie Robinson  is an Australian artist, whose works have been featured in the Australian National Gallery and have hung in the National Gallery of Victoria and the State Library of Victoria and written about in the Sydney Morning Herald.

Exhibitions
Beyond Reasonable Drought, The Map Group of Photographers, Five Mile Press, 2009

Publications
2016 Real Time Arts – Australia's critical guide to international contemporary arts
2014 Brisbane Art
2014 Sunshine Coast Art Prize
2014 Montage Graphix
2014 Brecknock Consulting
2014 Winter Night Festival Melbourne
2014 ABC Tropical North radio interview, Artspace Mackay July 16, 2014
2012 ABC Tropical North radio interview – Queensland Regional Art Awards, Oct 8
2012 Queensland Regional Art: Digital Art Award 2013
2012 Screengrab New Media Art Awards 2012
2012 Looking Forward, Looking Back 150 years of Mackay, Catalogue
2010 ABC Tropical North radio interview via phone from New York City, May 14, 2010
2010 Australian Art Collector Issue # 51 January – March 2010
2010 art guide Australia, March/ April 2010

See also
Australian art

References

External links
 Official website

Year of birth missing (living people)
Living people
Australian women artists
Australian contemporary artists